Nagaki is one of the 51 union councils of Abbottabad District in Khyber-Pakhtunkhwa province of Pakistan. According to the 2017 Census of Pakistan, the population is 11,439.

Subdivisions
 Banda Baz Dad
 Jaswal
 Nagaki
 Ukhreela

References

Union councils of Abbottabad District